Tembleque may refer to:

 Tembleque, a coconut dessert pudding from Puerto Rico
 Pollera, tembleques - a type of skirt- clothing
 Tembleque, Spain